Kalashi may refer to:
 Kalashi-ye Abdol Qader, Kermanshah Province
 Kalashi-ye Nahang, Kermanshah Province
 Kalashi District, in Kermanshah Province
 Kalashi Rural District, in Kermanshah Province